Bukomela is an administrative ward in Kahama Rural District, Shinyanga Region, Tanzania. In 2016 the Tanzania National Bureau of Statistics report there were 7,049 people in the ward, from 6,492 in 2012.

Villages / vitongoji 
The ward has 4 villages and 19 vitongoji.

 Bukomela
 Bukomela Kaskazini
 Bukomela Kati
 Bukomela Kusini
 Mikobe
 Kabila
 Kabila 'A'
 Kabila 'B'
 Ngokolo 'A'
 Ngokolo 'B'
 Shijengele
 Mliza
 Mliza 'A'
 Mliza 'B'
 Mliza 'C'
 Mliza 'D'
 Ngokolo
 Busulwanguku
 Iyogelo
 Kalonge
 Mlima Chasa
 Ngokolo 'D'
 Ngokolo Kati

References 

Populated places in Shinyanga Region
Wards of Tanzania